The 2000 Crawley Borough Council election took place on 4 May 2000 to elect members of Crawley Borough Council in West Sussex, England. One third of the council was up for election and the Labour Party stayed in overall control of the council.

After the election, the composition of the council was:
Labour 24
Conservative 6
Liberal Democrats 2

Background
Before the election Labour held control of the council with 24 seats, compared to 5 for the Conservatives and 2 for the Liberal Democrats. One seat was vacant after Labour councillor Jack Newsome resigned from the council on moving from the area.

Election result
Labour remained in control of the council after winning 10 of the 12 seats contested, but did lose 1 seat to the Conservatives. The Conservative gain came in the vacant Pound Hill South seat, with the party winning by 225 votes to take the Conservatives to 6 seats on the council.

By-elections between 2000 and 2002
A by-election was held in West Green on 14 September 2000 after the death of the Labour leader of Crawley Council, Tony Edwards. The by-election was dominated by plans to remove services from Crawley Hospital and Labour candidate Robert Hull held the seat with a reduced 151 vote majority, with a campaigner against the plans for the hospital coming second with 344 votes.

References

2000 English local elections
2000
2000s in West Sussex